Norway sent a delegation of 24 competitors, (14 men and 10 women,) to compete at the 2008 Summer Paralympics in Beijing, from September 6 to September 17, 2008.

Norwegian competitors took part in nine different sports: archery, athletics, boccia, cycling, equestrian, sailing, shooting, swimming and table tennis.

Medalists

Archery

 1 competitor:

Men

Athletics

 2 competitors:

Men

Women

Boccia

Paralympic Boccia is open to players with cerebral palsy and other major physical disabilities. There were no separate events for men and women.

3 competitors:

Individual

Team

Cycling

 1 competitor:

Track

Men

Pursuits

Time Trials

Road

Men

Equestrian

 
Equestrian in the Paralympic Games is Dressage only.
Anne Cecilie Ore was replaced by Silje Gillund, as Ore's horse received an injury before the Paralympic Games. There were no separate events for men and women. 5 competitors:

Individual

Team

'#' denotes scores that did not count toward the team total.

Sailing

 4 competitors:

CAN - Race cancelled
OCS - On the course side

Shooting

1 competitor:

Women

Swimming

 5 competitors:

Key
Q = Qualifiers for the final as decided on a time only basis. Ranks shown are overall rank against competitors in all heats

Table tennis

 
2 competitors:

Men

Individual

Team

See also
2008 Summer Paralympics
Norway at the Paralympics
Norway at the 2008 Summer Olympics

References

(Pdf-file) Competition Schedule by Event - Norway, Olympiatoppen, 2008

External links
Beijing 2008 Paralympic Games Official Site
International Paralympic Committee

Nations at the 2008 Summer Paralympics
2008
Paralympics